Norclomipramine, also known as N-desmethylclomipramine and chlordesipramine, is the major active metabolite of the tricyclic antidepressant (TCA) clomipramine (Anafranil).

References

Alpha-1 blockers
Secondary amines
Antihistamines
Chloroarenes
Dibenzazepines
H1 receptor antagonists
Human drug metabolites
Muscarinic antagonists
Serotonin receptor antagonists
Serotonin–norepinephrine reuptake inhibitors
Tricyclic antidepressants